Woman Key is an island in the Florida Keys in Monroe County, Florida, United States. It is within the boundaries of the Key West National Wildlife Refuge.

To its east are Ballast Key (the island farthest south in the area (at 24°31′23.0″N) and Man Key.

Half of the island's south-facing beach, as well as the sand spit on the southeast side, are closed to protect wildlife.

The beach and dunes are nesting sites for loggerhead sea turtles. Several species of wading birds also nest in the area and a large number of shorebirds use the sand spits on the southeast side of the island.

References

Islands of the Florida Keys
Islands of Monroe County, Florida
Beaches of Monroe County, Florida
Beaches of Florida
Islands of Florida